Andreas Niederberger (born 20 April 1963) is a German ice hockey player. He competed in the men's tournaments at the 1984, 1988, 1992 and the 1994 Winter Olympics.

References

External links
 

1963 births
Living people
Olympic ice hockey players of West Germany
Olympic ice hockey players of Germany
Ice hockey players at the 1984 Winter Olympics
Ice hockey players at the 1988 Winter Olympics
Ice hockey players at the 1992 Winter Olympics
Ice hockey players at the 1994 Winter Olympics
Sportspeople from Munich